Hattiesburg is a city in the U.S. state of Mississippi, located primarily in Forrest County (where it is the county seat and largest city) and extending west into Lamar County. The city population was 45,989 at the 2010 census, with the population now being 48,730 in 2020. Hattiesburg is the principal city of the Hattiesburg Metropolitan Statistical Area, which encompasses Covington, Forrest, Lamar, and Perry counties. The city is located in the Pine Belt region.

Development of the interior of Mississippi took place primarily after the American Civil War. Before that time, only properties along the major rivers were developed as plantations. Founded in 1882 by civil engineer William H. Hardy, Hattiesburg was named in honor of Hardy's wife Hattie. The town was incorporated two years later with a population of 400. Hattiesburg's population first expanded as a center of the lumber and railroad industries, from which was derived the nickname "The Hub City". It now attracts newcomers because of the diversity of its economy, strong neighborhoods, and the central location in South Mississippi.

Hattiesburg is home to the University of Southern Mississippi (founded as Mississippi Normal College, for the training of teachers) and William Carey University (formerly William Carey College). South of Hattiesburg is Camp Shelby, the largest US National Guard training base east of the Mississippi River, which hosts up to 100,000 National Guardsmen and Reservists annually.

History

During European colonization, this area was first claimed by the French. Between 1763 and 1783 the area that is currently Hattiesburg fell under the jurisdiction of the colony of British West Florida. After the United States gained its independence, Great Britain ceded this and other areas to it after 1783. The United States gained a cession of lands from the Choctaw and Chickasaw under the terms of the Treaty of Mount Dexter in 1805. After the treaty was ratified, European-American settlers began to move into the area.

In the 1830s, the Choctaw and Chickasaw were relocated by United States authorities by treaties authorized by the Indian Removal Act, which sought to relocate the Five Civilized Tribes from the Southeast to west of the Mississippi River. They and their slaves were moved to Indian Territory in today's Kansas and Oklahoma.

Hattiesburg developed at the confluence of the Leaf and Bouie rivers. It was founded in 1882 by Captain William H. Hardy, a civil engineer. The city of Hattiesburg was incorporated in 1884 with a population of approximately 400. Originally called Twin Forks and later Gordonville, the city received its final name of Hattiesburg from Capt. Hardy, in honor of his wife Hattie. Hattiesburg is centrally located less than 100 miles from the state capital of Jackson, as well as from the Mississippi Gulf Coast, New Orleans, Louisiana, and Mobile, Alabama.

In 1884, a railroad—known then as the New Orleans and Northeastern—was built from Meridian, Mississippi, in the center of the state, through Hattiesburg to New Orleans. The completion of the Gulf and Ship Island Railroad (G&SIRR) from Gulfport, to the capital of Jackson, Mississippi, also ran through Hattiesburg. It stimulated a lumber boom in 1897, with interior pine forests being harvested at a rapid pace. Although the railroad took 20 years to be developed, the G&SIRR more than fulfilled its promise. It gave the state access to a deep water harbor at Gulfport, more than doubled the population of towns along its route, stimulated the growth of the City of Gulfport, and made Hattiesburg a railroad center. In 1924, the G&SIRR operated as a subsidiary of the Illinois Central Railroad but lost its independent identity in 1946.

Hattiesburg gained its nickname, the Hub City, in 1912 as a result of a contest in a local newspaper. It was named because it was at the intersection of a number of important rail lines. Later U.S. Highway 49, U.S. Highway 98 and U.S. Highway 11, and later, Interstate 59 also intersected in and near Hattiesburg.

The region around Hattiesburg was involved in testing during the development of weapons in the nuclear arms race of the Cold War.  In the 1960s, two nuclear devices were detonated in the salt domes near Lumberton, Mississippi, about 28 miles southwest of Hattiesburg.  Extensive follow-up of the area by the EPA has not revealed levels of nuclear contamination in the area that would be harmful to humans.

Throughout the 20th century, Hattiesburg benefited from the founding of Camp Shelby (now a military mobilization center), two major hospitals, and two colleges, The University of Southern Mississippi and William Carey University. The growing metropolitan area that includes Hattiesburg, Forrest and Lamar counties, was designated a Metropolitan Statistical Area in 1994 with a combined population of more than 100,000 residents.

Around 10,000 structures in the area received major damage of some type from the heavy winds and rain, as the hurricane tracked inland. Approximately 80 percent of the city's roads were blocked by trees, and power was out in the area for up to 14 days. The storm killed 24 people in Hattiesburg and the surrounding areas. The city has struggled to cope with a large influx of temporary evacuees and new permanent residents from coastal Louisiana and Mississippi towns to the south, where damage from Katrina was catastrophic.

The City is known for its police department, as it was the first—and for almost a decade the only—Commission on Accreditation for Law Enforcement Agencies federally accredited law enforcement agency in the State of Mississippi. The department is served by its own training academy. It is considered one of the most difficult basic academies in the country, with a more than 50% attrition rate.

The Hattiesburg Zoo at Kamper Park is a longstanding tourist attraction in the city.

In 2011, the Hattiesburg Historic Neighborhood District was named one of the "Great Places In America," to live by the American Planning Association. Places are selected annually and represent the gold standard in terms of having a true sense of place, cultural and historical interest. The twenty-five-block neighborhood has one of the best collections of Victorian-era houses in Mississippi, with more than ninety percent of the houses substantially renovated and maintained. The Hattiesburg Historic Neighborhood District [HHND] was Hattiesburg's first recognized historic district and was listed on the National Register of Historic Places in 1980. It is also part of an Historic Conservation District and protected by Historic Hattiesburg Design Guidelines.

In 2013, the Hattiesburg Historic Neighborhood District celebrated the 38th Annual Victorian Candlelit Christmas and Holiday Tour of Homes. During the two nights of the Victorian Candlelit Christmas, thousands of candles burn in white bags lining the sidewalks. Christmas carolers from the three churches: Sacred Heart, Court Street Methodist, and Bay Street Presbyterian, stroll house to house singing Christmas music. Horse-drawn carriages carry visitors through the neighborhood at a walking pace.

The Miss Hospitality Pageant began in 1949. Hattiesburg was chosen in 1997 to sponsor the state pageant. The purpose of the pageant is the selection and presentation of a young, knowledgeable lady to help promote the state in tourism and economic development. Contestants are judged on the following categories: panel interview, one-on-one interview competition, Mississippi speech competition, commercial/black dress competition, and evening gown competition. The 2011 winner was Ann Claire Reynolds, a junior at University of Southern Mississippi who was majoring in elementary and special education.

Hattiesburg is home to the African American Military History Museum. The building opened as a USO club in 1942 to serve African Americans serving at Camp Shelby, as local facilities were racially segregated. It has been listed on the National Register of Historic Places. This building is the only remaining USO club site in the United States. It has been adapted for use as a museum interpreting African-American military history. Exhibits show their participation in all the major wars and the founding of Hattiesburg: exhibits include the Revolutionary War, Buffalo Soldiers, World Wars I and II, Desegregation, Korean War, Vietnam, Desert Storm, Global War on Terrorism, You Can Be A Soldier, Hattiesburg's Hall of Honor, and World Map. The museum is dedicated to the many African-American soldiers who have fought for their country.

Civil rights movement
Hattiesburg and the unincorporated African-American community of Palmers Crossing played a key role in the civil rights transitions of the 1960s. In 1959, black Korean War veteran Clyde Kennard applied to attend then all-white Mississippi Southern College (today University of Southern Mississippi). He was denied admission because of his race, as state colleges were legally segregated. When he persisted, the newly formed Mississippi State Sovereignty Commission, a taxpayer-supported agency ostensibly set up to encourage tourism, allegedly conspired to have him framed for a crime. He was sentenced to seven years in Parchman Prison. For years, National Association for the Advancement of Colored People leaders Medgar Evers, Vernon Dahmer, and other Forrest County civil rights activists fought to overturn the conviction. The MSSC allegedly conducted outrageous activities against citizens of the state: it was claimed that agents investigated citizens, it created blacklists of activists and black professionals who were suspected of working for civil rights, it conducted economic boycotts against black-owned businesses, or arranged for blacks to be fired from state and local jobs. They reportedly also worked to have black activists or suspected activists evicted from rental housing. All of this was conducted in secret, until later allegations of revelations brought the state's activities into the open.

Forrest County Registrar Theron Lynd prevented blacks in the area from registering to vote, based on such devices in the state constitution as poll taxes, and literacy and comprehension tests, subjectively administered by whites. In 1960, thirty percent of the population in the county was black, but less than 1% of blacks had been able to register, regardless of their education level. Registration by whites was close to 100%. In 1961, the U.S. Justice Department filed suit against Lynd. He was the first southern registrar to be convicted under the Civil Rights Act of 1957 for systematically violating African-American voting rights.

In 1962, the Student Nonviolent Coordinating Committee (SNCC) began one of its first voter-registration projects in Hattiesburg under the auspices of the Council of Federated Organizations (COFO). By 1964, the Delta Ministry was active in the city. In cooperation with the NAACP and local civil rights leaders, they formed the Forrest County Voters League. In conjunction with the 1963 elections, civil rights leaders organized a statewide Freedom Ballot, a mock election that claimed both the statewide pattern of voting rights discrimination and the strong desire of Mississippi blacks for the franchise. Despite the serious risk of both physical and economic retaliation, nearly half of Forrest County blacks participated, the highest turnout in the state.

January 22, 1964, was "Freedom Day" in Hattiesburg, a major voter registration effort supported by student demonstrators and 50 northern clergymen. For the first time since Reconstruction, an inter-racial protest was allowed to picket the courthouse for voting rights without being arrested. Roughly 100 African Americans attempted to register, though only a few were allowed into the courthouse due to (occupancy and space constraints) and fewer still succeeded in gaining entry on the rolls. Each day thereafter for many months, activists resumed the courthouse protest in what became known as the "Perpetual Picket."

During Freedom Summer in 1964, the Hattiesburg/Palmers Crossing project was the headquarters for all civil rights activity in Mississippi's 5th congressional district. This was the largest and most active site in the state, with more than 90 volunteers and 3,000 local participants. Hundreds of Forrest County blacks tried to register to vote at the courthouse, but blacks once again claimed without data that most were prevented from doing so. More than 650 children and adults attended one of the seven Freedom Schools in Hattiesburg and Palmers Crossing, three freedom libraries were set up with donated books, and a community center was established. It was alleged that “many” whites opposed civil rights efforts by blacks, and both summer volunteers and local African Americans endured arrests, beatings, firings, and evictions.

Forrest County was also a center of activity for the Mississippi Freedom Democratic Party (MFDP). It sent a slate of delegates to the National Democratic Convention in Atlantic City that year to challenge the seating of the all-white, pro-segregation delegates elected by the regular party in primaries from which African Americans had been largely excluded due to alleged voter registration barriers. Victoria Jackson Gray of Palmers Crossing ran on the MFDP ticket against incumbent Senator John Stennis, and John Cameron of Hattiesburg ran for Representative in the 5th District. With blacks not turning out to vote, these candidates knew they would not be elected, but their campaigns encouraged blacks to exercise their legal voting rights.

Even after passage of the federal Civil Rights Act of 1964 and the Voting Rights Act of 1965, resistance continued in Mississippi and Hattiesburg. On the night of January 10, 1966, the White Knights of the Ku Klux Klan reportedly attacked the Hattiesburg home of NAACP leader Vernon Dahmer with firebombs and gunfire. Dahmer was the most prominent black leader in the county and had been the primary civil rights leader for many years. Just prior to the attack, he had announced that he would help pay a $2 poll tax for black voters too poor to do so themselves. Dahmer held off the Klan with his rifle to give his wife, their three young children, and elderly aunt time to escape their burning home, but he died of burns and smoke inhalation the next day. His murder sparked large protest marches in Hattiesburg. A number of Klansmen were arrested for the crime, and four were eventually convicted. After four previous trials had ended in deadlocks, KKK Imperial Wizard Samuel Bowers was finally convicted in August 1998 for ordering the assassination of Dahmer. He was sentenced to life in prison.

In 1970, the U.S. Supreme Court ruled against trespass convictions of civil rights protesters in Adickes v. S.H. Kress Co.. The case involved a sit-in at the lunch counter of the S. H. Kress & Co. downtown.

Vela Uniform/Project Dribble nuclear tests
Vela Uniform was an element of Project Vela, conducted jointly in the 1960s by the United States Department of Energy and the Advanced Research Projects Agency. Its purpose was to develop seismic methods for detecting underground nuclear testing. The Project Dribble program involved two underground nuclear detonations. Test SALMON occurred on October 22, 1964, with a 5.3 kiloton yield; test STERLING was detonated December 3, 1966, with a yield of 380 tons. Both detonations took place within Tatum Salt Dome, southwest of the Hattiesburg/Purvis area.

Geography
Most of Hattiesburg is in Forrest County. A smaller portion on the west side is in Lamar County, with abundant commercial land gained in a 2008 annexation. This consists of first, a narrow stretch of land lying east of I-59, and second, an irregularly shaped extension into West Hattiesburg. In the 2000 census, 42,475 of the city's 44,779 residents (94.9%) lived in Forrest County and 2,304 (5.1%) in Lamar County.

Geology and paleontology
Hattiesburg is situated on an outcrop of the Pascagoula and Hattiesburg formation which is thought to be Miocene in age. Miocene plant and animal fossils discovered from the vicinity of Hattiesburg indicate the area was once more swamp-like and dominated by low-growing palm trees.

Climate
Hattiesburg has a humid subtropical climate, with short, mild winters and hot, humid summers. Snowfall is extremely rare, but on December 11, 2008, areas around Hattiesburg received . As is the case throughout the southern United States, severe thunderstorms can pose a threat, particularly during spring. Such storms spawn frequent lightning, heavy rain, occasional large hail, and tornadoes.
An EF4 tornado struck the Hattiesburg area on February 10, 2013, between roughly 5:00 p.m. and 5:30 p.m. CST.  This tornado formed in Lamar County just west of Oak Grove and quickly increased in size and intensity.  Although the most severe damage occurred in the Oak Grove area, especially near Oak Grove High School, the tornado continued eastward into Hattiesburg, causing widespread EF1-EF3 damage to the southern portion of the University of Southern Mississippi campus and the areas just north of downtown. It then moved into neighboring Petal and rural Forrest County. More than 80 injured were reported but no fatalities. The prevention of deaths was attributed to the nearly 30-minute lead time of the tornado warning.
The most recent tornado struck on January 21, 2017, when an EF3 hit the city early in the morning, killing four and injuring twenty. Some 10,000 people were left without power.

Demographics

2020 census

As of the 2020 United States census, there were 48,730 people, 17,778 households, and 9,165 families residing in the city.

2010 census
As of the 2010 United States Census, there were 45,989 people living in the city. 52.8% were African American, 40.5% White, 0.2% Native American, 0.9% Asian, 0.0% Pacific Islander, 0.1% from some other race and 1.1% from two or more races. 4.3% were Hispanic or Latino of any race.

2000 census
As of the census of 2000, there were 44,779 people, 17,295 households, and 9,391 families residing within the city limits.  The population density was 909.0 people per square mile (351.0/km2). There were 19,258 housing units at an average density of 391.0 per square mile (150.9/km2). The racial makeup of the city was 49.95% White, 47.34% African American, 0.15% Native American, 1.22% Asian, 0.02% Pacific Islander, 0.52% from other races, and 0.80% from two or more races. Hispanic or Latino people of any race were 1.41% of the population.

There were 17,295 households, out of which 25.3% had children under the age of 18 living with them, 31.1% were married couples living together, 19.4% had a female householder with no husband present, and 45.7% were non-families. 34.4% of all households were made up of individuals, and 9.3% had someone living alone who was 65 years of age or older. The average household size was 2.29 and the average family size was 3.01.

In the city, the population was spread out, with 21.5% under the age of 18, 24.4% from 18 to 24, 26.3% from 25 to 44, 16.0% from 45 to 64, and 11.8% who were 65 years of age or older. The median age was 27 years. For every 100 females, there were 85.3 males. For every 100 females age 18 and over, there were approximately 81.3 males.

The median income for a household in the city was $24,409, and the median income for a family was $32,380. Males had a median income of $26,680 versus $19,333 for females. The per capita income for the city was $15,102. About 21.5% of families and 28.3% of the population were below the poverty line, including 36.3% of those under age 18 and 16.7% of those age 65 or over.

Religion
In 2010 the Hattiesburg Metropolitan area has an Evangelical Protestant majority with 66,000 members. The Southern Baptist Convention has 85 congregations and 53,000 members. The United Methodist Church has 35 congregations and 9,000 members. The third largest is the Presbyterian Church in America with 5 congregations and 1,518 members.

Economy

Hattiesburg is home to several national business branches that hold thousands of jobs across the Pine Belt.  It was headquarters to the now defunct International Filing Company and currently hosts branches of Kohler Engines and BAE Systems Inc., as well as Berry Plastics and the Coca-Cola Bottling Company United, Pepsi Cola Bottling Co., and Budweiser Distribution Co.  Companies such as Sunbeam (shared with Mr. Coffee, and the Coleman Company) and Kimberly Clark used to manufacture in Hattiesburg.

Regions Financial Corporation operates a large operations center in the city, which employs nearly 500 people. Jones Capital recently celebrated the groundbreaking of their new $50 million corporate headquarters facility in Midtown Hattiesburg across from The University of Southern Mississippi. Jones operates globally with over 1,000 employees in total, 500 of those are employed in the State of MS. The new headquarters facility will serve as the primary office for over 300 MS-based employees.

The main shopping mall is Turtle Creek Mall.

Arts and culture

Theaters
 The Saenger Theatre was one of the seven built and operated by the Saenger brothers.  It hosts an annual Mississippi Miss Hospitality Competition, along with other productions. It is listed on the National Register of Historic Places.
 William Carey Center and Dinner Theater
 University of Southern Mississippi Theatre Department features original productions and broadcasts of National Theatre Live! from London, UK.

Galleries
 A GALLERY, 134 E. Front Street
 Hattiesburg Arts Council Gallery at the Hattiesburg Cultural Center, 723 Main Street
 Lucile Parker Art Gallery is located in the Thomas Fine Arts Building on William Carey University's Hattiesburg campus. The collection consists of 141 artworks by Lucile Parker, and 17 by Marie Hull. From August to May, the gallery features exhibitions of local, state, and nationally known artists.
 Sarah Gillespie Collection at William Carey University, 498 Tuscan Avenue, is an extensive collection of twentieth century Mississippi art.
 University of Southern Mississippi Art Gallery

Museums
 African American Military History Museum, 305 E. 6th Street
 Mississippi Armed Forces Museum at Camp Shelby
 Freedom Summer Trails
 Hattiesburg Area Historical Society Museum, 723 Main Street
 De Grummond Children's Literature Museum

Train depot
The Hattiesburg Train Depot was constructed in 1910 by the Southern Railway Company, and was the city's largest and most architecturally significant depot. The completed depot now functions as an intermodal transportation center for bus, taxi and rail, as well as a space for exhibitions, meetings and special events.

Government

Hattiesburg is governed via a mayor-council system. The mayor, currently Toby Barker, is elected at large. The city council consists of five members who are each elected from one of five wards, known as single-member districts. The current city council consists of the members (Council President) Ward 1 - Jeffrey George, Ward 2 - Deborah Delgado, Ward 3 - Carter Carroll, (Council Vice President) Ward 4 - Dave Ware, and Ward 5 - Nicholas Brown.

Education

Public education in most of Hattiesburg is served by the Hattiesburg Municipal Separate School District, serving grades K–12. Portions of Hattiesburg are served by Forrest County Schools. Portions of Hattiesburg in Lamar County are zoned to Lamar County School District.

Hattiesburg High School is a part of the Hattiesburg district. North Forrest High School (grades 7–12) is a part of the Forrest school district. Oak Grove High School (grades 9–12) is under the Lamar County School District.

Forrest County Agricultural High School is an independent public high school near Hattiesburg.

Colleges
Hattiesburg is home to the main campuses of two institutions of higher learning: the public University of Southern Mississippi (USM) and the private Baptist-supported William Carey University. Both have campuses in other locations; USM has a campus in Long Beach, Mississippi, and William Carey has campuses in Gulfport, and New Orleans, Louisiana. The Forrest County Center of Pearl River Community College, a public institution, is located in Hattiesburg, with the main campus located in Poplarville, Mississippi.

Private schools

 Sacred Heart Catholic School (grades Pre-K–12)
 Presbyterian Christian School (grades PreK–12)
 School of Excellence (grades K–6) (now Early Learning Center, 6 weeks to Pre-K)
 Lamar Christian School (grades Pre-K-12)
 Bass Christian Elementary (grades K–8)
 Bass Memorial Academy (grades 9–12)
 Central Baptist School (grades K–12)
 Benedict Day School (grades K–8)
Innova Prep (grades K-12)
 The Adept School

Libraries

Forrest County Public Library serves the city. The library has a location in downtown Hattiesburg as well as in neighboring Petal.

Media

FM radio
 WUSM-FM  88.5 (Public Radio)
 WAII 89.3 American Family Radio (Christian Contemporary)
 WJMG 92.1 (Urban Contemporary)
 WGDQ 93.1 (Urban Gospel)
 WKZW 94.3 (Hot Adult Contemporary)
 WBBN 95.9 (Country music)
 WBBL 96.5 (Southern Gospel)
 WFMM 97.3 Supertalk Mississippi (Talk)
 WMXI 98.1 (News/Talk)
 WLAU 99.3 Supertalk Mississippi (News/Talk)
 WNSL 100.3 (Pop music), (Top 40)
 W266CT 101.1 (Classic Hip Hop), (Urban Oldies), (Blues) (Simulcast of WHJA AM 890)
 WJKX 102.5 (Urban Adult Contemporary)
 WFFX 103.7 (Active rock)
 WXRR 104.5 (Classic rock)
 WQID-LP 105.3 (Urban Contemporary)
 WZLD 106.3 (Urban Contemporary)
 WLVZ 107.1 (Contemporary Christian)

AM radio
 WHJA 890 (Classic Hip Hop), (Urban Oldies), (Blues)
 WHSY 950 (Classic Country)
 WFOR 1400 (Fox Sports Radio)
 WORV 1580 (Gospel Music)

Television
 WDAM Channel 7 (NBC) (ABC)
 WHLT Channel 22 (CBS)
 WHPM-LD Channel 23 (Fox)

Newspapers
 Hattiesburg American, Hattiesburg's thrice weekly newspaper, a Gannett paper
 The Hattiesburg Post, a locally owned, independent weekly paper
 The Lamar Times, a weekly community newspaper serving the residents of West Hattiesburg and Lamar County

Infrastructure

Transportation

Rail
Amtrak's Crescent train connects Hattiesburg with the cities of New York, Philadelphia, Baltimore, Washington, Charlotte, Atlanta, Birmingham and New Orleans. The Amtrak station is located at 308 Newman Street.

Rail freight service is offered by three Class I railroads:  CN to Jackson and Mobile, Kansas City Southern to Gulfport, and Norfolk Southern to Meridian and New Orleans.

Mass transit

Hattiesburg owns and operates the city's mass transit service, HCT, Hub City Transit. HCT offers daily routes to many major thoroughfares. The Intermodal Depot downtown services Amtrak as well as the city transit services. Due to recent growth in passenger transport in the city, HCT is currently planning additional routes and services, including bus service to the suburbs of Oak Grove and Petal.

Air
Hattiesburg-Laurel Regional Airport is located in an unincorporated area in Jones County, near Moselle. It offers daily flights from Hattiesburg to Houston. The airport also has a business park located on the premises.

The city of Hattiesburg maintains the Hattiesburg Bobby L. Chain Municipal Airport (HBG) in the Hattiesburg/Forrest County Industrial Park. Located four miles south of the city center, the municipal airport provides business and general aviation services for much of South Mississippi.

Highways

Major local routes
Major east-west roads include:
4th Street,
Hardy Street/ US Route 98,
Oak Grove Road,
Lincoln Road,
Classic Drive,
7th Street,
and Old MS Highway 42.

Major north-south roads include:
Interstate 59,
US Route 11/Broadway Drive/Veterans Memorial,
West Pine Street,
Main Street,
US Highway 98,
28th Avenue,
Golden Eagle Avenue,
38th Avenue,
40th Avenue,
Westover,
Weathersby Road,
and King Road/Old Highway 11.

Notable people
 Victoria Jackson Gray Adams, educator and civil rights leader
 Fred Armisen, actor, comedian and musician, star of Portlandia
 Steven Barthelme, writer and critic
 Wally Berg, first American mountaineer to summit Lhotse, in 1990
 Raylawni Branch, civil rights activist and nurse educator
 Roger Brent, biologist
 Jesse L. Brown, first African-American naval aviator in United States Navy
 Shelby Cannon, tennis player
 Paul Ott Carruth, NFL player
 Robert Carson, pitcher for New York Mets
 John Prentiss Carter, lieutenant governor of Mississippi (1904–1908)
 Lewis Elliott Chaze, journalist and author of 10 novels
 Shea Curry, actress
 Vernon Dahmer, civil rights leader killed in Hattiesburg by Klansmen in 1966
 Tyler Dickerson, singer
 Adam Doleac, singer
 Bob Dudley, BP executive in charge of Deepwater Horizon oil spill
 Ernest Duff (1931–2016), businessman, lawyer and Mormon bishop
 Wesley Eure, actor in Days of Our Lives and Land of the Lost
 Woody Evans, writer and librarian
 Barbara Ferrell, Olympic gold and silver medalist in National Track and Field Hall of Fame
 Tim Floyd, basketball coach, University of Texas at El Paso, Iowa State, USC, Chicago Bulls
 Joey Gathright, MLB outfielder 2004–2011
 Naomi Gray, first female Vice President of Planned Parenthood 
 Todd Grisham, ESPN anchor, former WWE announcer
 Gary Grubbs, actor
 Ray Guy, Oakland Raiders punter in College and Pro Football Hall of Fame
 Charlie Hayes, MLB infielder, 1996 World Series champion
 Melinda Haynes, novelist
 Beth Henley, Pulitzer Prize-winning playwright
 Eddie Hodges, actor and singer
 Clifton Hyde, musician and member of Blue Man Group
 Harold Jackson, NFL wide receiver, 5-time Pro Bowl selection
 Fred Lewis, outfielder for Hiroshima Toyo Carp
 Louis Lipps, NFL Pro Bowl wide receiver, 1984 AFC Rookie of the Year, Pittsburgh Steelers
 Hank Lott, Republican state representative; born in Hattiesburg in 1974
 Jack Lucas, youngest Marine to receive Medal of Honor
 Mark Mann, artist
 Danny Manning, basketball player, NCAA champion for Kansas, 1st selection of 1988 NBA Draft, Olympic medalist, 2-time NBA All-Star
 Walter E. Massey, president of Morehouse College, director of National Science Foundation under George Bush, president of Art Institute of Chicago
 Oseola McCarty, benefactor and winner of Presidential Citizens Medal
 Matt Miller, professional baseball player
 Mississippi Matilda, Delta blues singer and songwriter who, in 1936, recorded four songs for Bluebird Records
 Picasso Nelson, football player
 Jonathan Papelbon, Major League Baseball pitcher, 6-time All-Star
 Van Dyke Parks, musician, songwriter, record producer, actor
 Jamal Peters , professional Canadian football defensive back for the Toronto Argonauts of the Canadian Football League (CFL).
 Patrik-Ian Polk, film director, writer, and producer
 Todd Pinkston, NFL player for Philadelphia Eagles
 Johnny Rawls, soul blues singer and guitarist
 Purvis Short,  NBA player
 Taylor Spreitler, actress
 Robert L. Stewart, NASA astronaut
 Walter Suggs, professional football player, Houston Oilers
 James Wheaton, actor, director, educator (resident infancy to age 12)
 Webb Wilder, musician and actor
 Iola Williams, politician and activist, first African-American member of the San Jose City Council, founder and former executive director the African American Military History Museum
 Amos Wilson, author and activist
 Henry Winston, Chairman of the American Communist Party (1966-1986) and Marxist civil rights activist 
 Craig Wiseman, songwriter
 Walter H. Yates, Jr., major general, U.S. Army
 Walter Young, professional baseball player
 Joseph Edgar Foreman, (better known by his stage name Afroman), an American rapper, singer, songwriter, comedian and musician (He is best known for his song "Because I Got High", released in 2000.)

See also

Eureka School (Hattiesburg, Mississippi)
Forrest County Multipurpose Center
Old Hattiesburg High School
Pat Harrison Waterway District

References

External links

 City of Hattiesburg official website
 Hattiesburg.com - visitor and business information

 
Cities in Mississippi
County seats in Mississippi
Cities in Hattiesburg metropolitan area
Populated places established in 1882
Cities in Forrest County, Mississippi
Cities in Lamar County, Mississippi